Palaeobatrachus (meaning "ancient frog" in Greek) is an extinct genus of frogs from Europe that existed from the middle Eocene to the middle Pleistocene (Ionian Stage) (621-568,000 years ago), spanning almost 50 million years. They were obligately aquatic, and would have not spent much time on dry land. They are one of two genera and by far the largest genus in the family Palaeobatrachidae, which are considered to be members of Pipimorpha, related to the South American-African family Pipidae, which includes the African clawed frog and Surinam toad.

Description

Palaeobatrachus had a relatively broad skull the shape of a Gothic arch.

Taxonomy
Palaeobatrachus was the first fossil frog to be described, with the first species being P. diluvianus named by Goldfuss in 1831, originally as Rana diluviana from remains found in uppermost Oligocene strata near Bonn in Germany. It was later recognised as distinct and placed in the new separate genus Palaeobatrachus by Tschudi in 1839.

The Eocene genus Albionbatrachus was considered a synonym of Palaeobatrachus by Wuttke et al. (2012), but Roček et al. (2015) retained it as a separate taxon.

The nominal species Palaeobatrachus occidentalis was described from material found in the Late Cretaceous-Early Paleocene of western North America, but Roček (2013) questioned its generic attribution.

Habitat and paleoecology
Its skeletal remains are plentiful in freshwater sediments in western Bohemia, in Geiseltal (west Germany) and in east Germany. They are sometimes preserved very well indeed, with impressions of internal organs, muscles, nerves, blood vessels and epidermis, and with traces of coloring. Tadpoles and eggs have also been found.

These frogs lived permanently in water. Their bag-shaped lungs, on the dorsal side of their body, enabled them to remain submerged for long periods. They inhabited through-drainage basins or swamps where brown coal deposits were formed. Like the African clawed toad, they probably lived on small crustaceans, insect larvae and small fish and themselves provided sustenance for many other animals.

The climatic change at the beginning of the Pliocene was a real catastrophe for Palaeobatrachus, which required warmth, and, being specialized, was unable to adapt itself to the altered conditions. Water-rich and warm environments that existed in the area of the Netherlands, acting as a refugium for Palaeobatrachus, made it possible for one species (P. eurydices) to survive in western europe as recently as the early Pleistocene. In addition a species persisted in southern Russia until the mid Pleistocene.

References

Further reading
 

Oligocene amphibians
Miocene amphibians
Pliocene amphibians
Pleistocene amphibians
Pleistocene extinctions
Paleogene amphibians of Europe
Neogene amphibians of Europe
Quaternary amphibians of Europe
Fossil taxa described in 1839
Mesobatrachia